The Norway women's national football team is controlled by the Football Association of Norway. The team is former European, World and Olympic champions and thus one of the most successful national teams. The team has had less success since the 2011 FIFA Women's World Cup.

History

Norway women's national football team emerged in 1978 for the Nordic Championship tournament, which was relatively early for Western Europe, but late for the Nordic countries, beating only Iceland. Having little culture for official clubs and a series system, Norway had a lot to do to catch up to especially Sweden and Denmark. Their early history therefore consisted of losing to their neighbours and eventually beating Northern Ireland for their first win.

A power to be reckoned with
Eventually, Norway marked themselves as one of the better countries in Europe, if inferior to their Nordic neighbours. They beat England, France and Switzerland. In the first qualification for the European Competition for Representative Women's Teams (later renamed UEFA Women's Championship), Norway played opposite Sweden, Finland and Iceland. Norway lost both matches against Sweden, but beat Finland over both matches. A surprising home draw against Iceland mattered little, Norway took the second spot in a qualification where only the best teams qualified. Sweden later won the Euros.

The start of the golden years
Norway seemed to have problems with Sweden, and they lost 0–5, their biggest loss at the time (if repeated later) shortly afterwards. Compared to other teams, however, Norway improved, and they beat Denmark and West Germany in the qualification for the 1987 Euros. The Euros, consisting as the men's Euros had been until 1980 of two semi finals and a final played in one of the countries qualified for it. In this case, Norway was the host for the four matches. Norway beat Italy in the semifinals and met Sweden in the finals. The finals was the first time Norway beat Sweden in a match, as Norway won 2–1. This made the national football team the first Norwegian sports team ever to have won anything, eleven years ahead of the Norway women's national handball team.

Norway continued to win the next year as they beat Sweden again in a final in an invitational and unofficial world cup in China. In the 1989 Euros Norway made the finals against West Germany, but this time lost 1–4. After that loss the coaches resigned, leaving the helm to Even Pellerud. Pellerud saw Norway progress to the 1991 FIFA Women's World Cup. Before the first official world cup, Norway made it to the fourth (and Norway's third in a row) final of the Euros, where Norway again met Germany. Germany won in extra time. In the World cup Norway made it to the semifinals, where they lost to the USA.

Following that, Pellerud led the team to the 1993 Euros. Norway beat Denmark in the semifinals and Italy in the finals, winning their second Euros. Norway followed up with winning the 1994 Algarve Cup, the first ever to be arranged. The focus the next year was the World Cup and its antecedent Euros, which also functioned as a qualifier for the World Cup. Norway met Italy already in the quarter finals, and won it. Sweden managed to come back and thrash Norway in the second semifinal in Sweden, winning 5–7 after two matches. Norway was still qualified for the World Cup.

World Champions and beyond
The 1995 World Cup in Sweden is part of Norwegian sports heritage. Norway won all their matches in the group stage, and continued to meet an unconvincing Denmark in the quarter finals. Norway was up 3–0 with five minutes to go, and while conceding a goal a minute later, Norway was never threatened. The next encounter for Norway was the US, and in a close match, USA could never respond to an early goal by Ann Kristin Aarønes, and the USA lost their first official international tournament. Norway met Germany in the finals. Having lost two Euro finals, Norway were not among the favourites, but they defeated Germany by two goals scored within the space of four minutes, becoming world champions. Pellerud resigned shortly afterwards.

From the first women's football in the Olympic Games, it was considered equal with the world cup in rank. Norway qualified as a matter of course because of their win in the World Cup. Norway drew with Brazil, and beat Germany and Japan, proceeding to the semi finals. There they lost to the US after extra time, but won the bronze medal after defeating Brazil.

The 1997 Euros turned out to be a big disappointment for the ruling world champions at home, and Norway only made it to the semi-finals. This was the last time the two-year gap was used, making it easier to focus on the two competitions separately. Norway eased through to the 1999 FIFA Women's World Cup, where they beat all their opposition in the group stage. They met Sweden in the quarter finals, proving that now Norway had the upper hand by beating them 3–1. Surprisingly, Norway lost heavily to China, who won 5–0, thus equaling the embarrassment Sweden defeated Norway some 13 years earlier. In the bronze final, Norway lost to Brazil on penalties in front of a record 90,185 spectators.

Norway was not among the biggest favourites to win the Sydney Olympics. They started off losing to the US, but picked up nicely by beating Nigeria and China, the latter by one goal. In the semi finals Norway beat Germany with a lucky own goal by Tina Wunderlich after Germany pressed the Norwegians for the better part of the match. The final saw Norway against heavy favourites USA in an even match. Tiffeny Milbrett took the lead for the US, but Norway equaled the score by Gro Espeseth and stayed in the game with a good keeper in Bente Nordby. Norway took the lead in the match via a header by Ragnhild Gulbrandsen, but Milbrett scored in stoppage time to prolong the match to extra time with golden goal. Norway scored the winner in what seemed like a handball. The coach Per-Mathias Høgmo quit after achieving this feat.

Decline
Åge Steen took over as coach, but under his tutelage, things went from top to mediocre. In the 2001 Euros Norway's play was lackluster, and while making it to the semi finals thanks to the French national team, Norway lost clearly to Germany. In the 2003 World Cup Norway disappointed with a fumbling 1–4 to Brazil in the group stage before losing to USA in the quarter finals. As Greece was arranging the 2004 Summer Olympics, there were only two additional spots for European teams, and Sweden and Germany, who had both proceeded to the finals, took them. Steen continued for another year, as stipulated by his contract, but was replaced in late 2004.

Brief recovery
Under the new coach, Bjarne Berntsen, Norway took things up a notch by reaching the final of the 2005 Euros with a classic 3–2 win over Sweden in extra time in the semifinal. Again Germany defeated Norway to win the championship. Norway continued to achieve reasonable results except in the Algarve Cup where the results started to slip.

Despite this Norway qualified for the 2007 FIFA Women's World Cup in China. They drew with Australia and narrowly beat Canada, and then a 7–2 win over Ghana took them to the top of their group. Norway then progressed further by beating China 1–0, but lost 0–3 to Germany in the semifinal. In the bronze final Norway lost 1–4 to the US to finish in fourth place in the World Cup, which qualified them to enter the Beijing Olympics. Norway's top scorer Ragnhild Gulbrandsen was awarded the Bronze Boot behind Marta of Brazil and Abby Wambach of the United States.

From there Berntsen's fortunes began to wane. First he was criticized for telling Lise Klaveness she had no future in the national team under him, at 1a.m. at Oslo airport as they were arriving back from China, a gross error that he later admitted. Then in the 2008 Olympics Norway first impressively beat USA, then lost to Japan 1–5 and went out in the quarter finals against Brazil. In October 2008, five players refused to play in the National Team, making comments that implied playing under Berntsen was too much of a burden, which led to a media outcry. With a reduced team, and also after some less controversial resignations, Norway produced a relatively good result at the 2009 UEFA Women's Championship by beating Sweden 3–1 in the quarter-finals, even with an embarrassing 0–4 against Germany and a modest 1–0 against Iceland and 1–1 against France. After the championship, Berntsen's contract ended.

Landsem
Eli Landsem, the first woman coach and the first coach with experience of coaching women's football, took over at the end of 2009. Under her some of the players who had previously elected not to play returned. Landsem produced acceptable results and the team qualified to play in the 2011 FIFA World Cup after winning all but one of the matches in their qualification group. However Norway failed to reach the quarter-finals for the first time in its history after losing to Brazil (0–3) and Australia (1–2). As a result, they also failed to qualify for the 2012 Summer Olympics.

The next task was qualification to the 2013 European Cup competition, with Norway in Group3 with Iceland, Northern Ireland, Belgium, Hungary and Bulgaria. The campaign began badly with 3–1 losses to Iceland and 64th-ranked Northern Ireland, but in 2012 the position was recovered with wins in the last six matches, and Norway finished top of Group3 with eight wins from ten matches. They later went on to finish as runners-up in the finals in Sweden.

Struggle
At the 2015 FIFA Women's World Cup, Norway was drawn into a group with Germany, Thailand and the Ivory Coast. Norway performed well in the group stage, as the team beat Thailand 4–0 and the Ivory Coast 3–1. They drew 1–1 against former champions Germany. Norway would lose 2–1 in the round of sixteen to England. England went on to win the bronze medal.

2016–present
On 16 December 2016 Martin Sjögren was introduced as the new coach of Norway. He had previous coaching experience in the Damallsvenskan with Linköpings and LdB FC Malmö.

Norway qualified for Euro 2017 without losing a game. They were drawn into Group A alongside the Netherlands, Belgium and Denmark. Norway was the highest ranked team in Group A, and were predicted by many to win the group. They ended up being one of the biggest disappointments of the tournament as they lost all three group games without scoring a goal.

On 9 September 2017 Norway striker and 2016 UEFA Women's Player of the Year Ada Hegerberg announced she was taking a break from international duty, and was unsure when or if she would return.

On 7 October 2017 the Norway Football Association announced that Norway's male and female players would receive equal financial compensation, with the men making a contribution to the women's team. This equalled nearly a fifty percent increase in compensation for the women.

On 4 September 2018 Norway defeated the Netherlands 2–1 in their final group game of UEFA World Cup Qualifying. As a result, Norway won qualifying Group3 and secured an automatic berth in the 2019 World Cup, while the Netherlands who won Euro 2017 were forced to go to the play-off.

Euro 2022
In their Euro 2022 group stage match against England on 11 July 2022, the team suffered their biggest defeat, losing 8–0. Norway was eliminated after the first round, as in 2017, after losing the final Group A match against Austria (0–1), having won only one match, in the opening match against Northern Ireland (4–1). In addition, Ada Hegerberg, back in the national team after several years of falling out with the federation, did not score a single goal.

All-time record
Source:

Results and fixtures

 The following is a list of match results in the last 12 months, as well as any future matches that have been scheduled.

Legend

2022

2023

Coaching staff

Current coaching staff

Players

Current squad
The following 25 players were initially called up for the Friendly against France and the England on 11 and 15 November 2022.

Caps and goals are correct as of 16 November 2022, after the match against England.

Recent call-ups
The following players have also been called up to the squad in last 12 months.

WIT Withdrew from the squad
INJ Injured

Previous squads
1991 FIFA Women's World Cup
1995 FIFA Women's World Cup
1999 FIFA Women's World Cup
2003 FIFA Women's World Cup
2007 FIFA Women's World Cup
2011 FIFA Women's World Cup
2015 FIFA Women's World Cup
2019 FIFA Women's World Cup

Records

, after the match against Austria.
Players in bold are still active with Norway.

Most caps

Most goals

Competitive record

FIFA Women's World Cup

*Draws include knockout matches decided on penalty kicks.

Match history

Olympic Games

*Draws include knockout matches decided on penalty kicks.

UEFA Women's Championship

*Draws include knockout matches decided on penalty kicks.

Algarve Cup
The Algarve Cup is a global invitational tournament for national teams in women's soccer hosted by the Portuguese Football Federation (FPF). Held annually in the Algarve region of Portugal since 1994, it is one of the most prestigious women's football events, alongside the Women's World Cup and Women's Olympic Football.

Invitational trophies
Algarve Cup: Winner 1994, 1996, 1997, 1998, 2019
Albena Cup: Winner 1988, 1989
Four Nations Tournament: Winner 2002, 2013
Cyprus Tournament: Winner 1993

See also

Sport in Norway
Football in Norway
Women's football in Norway
List of Norway women's international footballers
Norway women's national under-17 football team

References

Notes

External links
 
FIFA profile

 
Kniksen Award winners
European women's national association football teams
FIFA Women's World Cup-winning countries
UEFA Women's Championship-winning countries